"Little One" is a song by American soul/jazz artist Bilal. The song is the second single from his album Airtight's Revenge.  The song earned him a second Grammy Award nomination for Best Urban/Alternative Performance.

Music video
Both the song and the video deal with the subject of autistic children, with the latter telling the story of a family discovering the son is autistic.
The video, dedicated to Bilal's autistic son Bashir, stars actors Erica Hubbard, Dorian Missick (Mooz-lum, The Cape), and NFL star Sinorice Moss and is directed by Matthew A. Cherry.

Track listing
US Digital MP3 single

References

External links
myspace.combilaloliver
plugresearch.combilal

2009 songs
Bilal (American singer) songs
Songs written by Bilal (American singer)
2010 singles
Plug Research singles
Autism in the arts
Works about autism
Songs about diseases and disorders
Songs about children